Compostela may refer to:

Santiago de Compostela, Galicia, Spain
Archdiocese of Santiago de Compostela
Compostela (la), a certificate given to those who have walked the Camino de Santiago (Way of St James)
SD Compostela, Spanish football team based in Santiago de Compostela
University of Santiago de Compostela, public university founded in 1495
Azua de Compostela, Azua, Dominican Republic 
Compostela de Indias, Nayarit, Mexico
Compostela, Davao de Oro, a municipality in Davao Region, Philippines
Compostela, Cebu, a municipality in Central Visayas, Philippines
Compostela (album), a 2014 album by Canadian singer-songwriter Jenn Grant

See also
 Bernard of Compostella (disambiguation)